Bill Young (18 December 1886 – 12 April 1959) was an Australian rules footballer who played with St Kilda in the Victorian Football League (VFL).

Notes

External links 

1886 births
1959 deaths
Australian rules footballers from Victoria (Australia)
St Kilda Football Club players
Brighton Football Club players